Heroes Reborn may refer to:

Marvel Comics
 "Heroes Reborn" (1996 comic), a 1996–97 crossover story arc among comic book series published by the American company Marvel Comics
 "Heroes Reborn" (2021 comic), a 2021 comic book storyline published by Marvel Comics
 Marvel Heroes Reborn, a British comic book series which was a part of the Marvel UK's 'Collector's Edition' line

Television
 Heroes Reborn (miniseries), an American television series with 13 episodes